Ernfold is a village in the Canadian province of Saskatchewan within the Rural Municipality of Morse No. 165 and Census Division No. 7. Initially situated alongside the original two-lane highway, the village was enclosed by the opposing lanes of the divided Trans-Canada Highway in 1973. In order to avoid complete destruction of the village the eastbound lane of the Trans-Canada Highway was rerouted approximately 3 km south of the village, leaving the village sandwiched between the Trans-Canada.

The village's population peaked at around 300 citizens.

History 
Ernfold incorporated as a village on December 4, 1912.

Demographics 

Heritage sites

First and foremost the most significant historical heritage site in Ernfold is the 80 km sign. 
The Ernfold School is a stately red brick, -story Georgian Revival structure built in 1919. The building served as an integral part of the community as a school until it closed in 1972. It was then used as a Baptist church for a short time until the church closed in 1989.

The schoolhouse remains a notable landmark with its bell tower and symmetrical form, to passersby through the village, driving westbound on the Trans-Canada Highway.

On May 6, 1990 the Village of Ernfold passed (Bylaw No. 90-1), placing the building on the Canadian Register of Historic Places as a Municipal Heritage Property.

See also 
 List of communities in Saskatchewan
 Villages of Saskatchewan

References

Villages in Saskatchewan
Morse No. 165, Saskatchewan
Division No. 7, Saskatchewan